Omar Nicolás Pires (born 2 December 2000) is an Argentine professional footballer who plays as a midfielder.

Career
Pires' career got underway with Almirante Brown of Primera B Metropolitana. His debut arrived on 17 November 2018 at the age of seventeen, as he came off the substitutes bench in a 1–1 league draw away to Deportivo Riestra. Another appearance came later that month at home to Acassuso, who ran out three-goal winners at the Estadio Fragata Presidente Sarmiento.

Personal life
Pires has a footballing sibling: Lucas. He also played professionally for Almirante Brown. They have two cousins, Gastón and Matías, who featured alongside them in the Almirante Brown youth ranks.

Career statistics
.

References

External links

2000 births
Living people
Place of birth missing (living people)
Argentine footballers
Association football midfielders
Primera B Metropolitana players
Club Almirante Brown footballers